CHM may refer to:

Biology and medicine
 CHM, abbreviation for Clearing House Mechanism under the Convention on Biological Diversity
 CHM, a human gene that encodes Rab escort protein 1
 Choroideremia, a retinal disease caused by mutations in the CHM gene
 ChM, advanced qualification in surgery, (Magister Chirurgiae). See Master of Surgery
 Chinese herbal medicine abbreviation, see Chinese herbology
 Christian Healthcare Ministries, a Health care sharing ministry
 Children's Hospital of Michigan, in Detroit, Michigan
 Commission on Human Medicines, a committee of the UK's Medicines and Healthcare Products Regulatory Agency
 Michigan State University College of Human Medicine

Museums
 Chicago History Museum, founded in 1856 to study and interpret Chicago's history
 Colorado History Museum, a museum in Denver on the history of the state of Colorado
 Computer History Museum, established in 1996 in Mountain View, California

Other
 ".chm", filename extension for ChemDraw Chemical Structure files
 ".chm", filename extension for Microsoft Compiled HTML Help files
 chm, ISO 639 code for Mari language
 CHM, abbreviation for contraharmonic mean
 CHM, IATA code for Tnte. FAP Jaime Montreuil Morales Airport, Peru
 CHM, Amtrak station code for Illinois Terminal in Champaign, Illinois
 Ch.M., postnominal for Magistral Chaplain, used by the Sovereign Military Order of Malta
 ChM, the label of the Chelyabinsk meteor
 Channel M (Southeast Asia), a cable TV channel in Southeast Asia
 College Hockey Mid-America, an American Collegiate Hockey Association
 Congregation of the Humility of Mary, a congregation of religious sisters in the Catholic Church
 Conservative Holiness Movement, a theologically conservative group of Methodist, Quaker, Anabaptist and Restorationist denominations
 Cultural heritage management, the vocation and practice of managing cultural heritage